National Lampoon's Loaded Weapon 1 (also known simply as  Loaded Weapon 1) is a 1993 American parody film directed and co-written by Gene Quintano, and starring Emilio Estevez, Samuel L. Jackson, Kathy Ireland, Frank McRae, Tim Curry and William Shatner. The film mainly spoofs the first three Lethal Weapon films, as well as several others including Basic Instinct, Die Hard, Dirty Harry, Rambo, The Silence of the Lambs, Wayne's World, 48 Hrs. and TV series such as CHiPs. Loaded Weapon 1 was released on February 5, 1993.

Plot

In Los Angeles, Billie York is murdered by a man known as Mr Jigsaw because she possesses a microfilm that can turn cocaine into cookies. Her former partner, Wes Luger, who is about to retire, is assigned the case by the reluctant captain Doyle, who dismisses it as a suicide but gives Luger the case. The catch is that Luger will have to be partnered with Jack Colt, a burned out cop who recently lost his dog, Claire. The two visit Harold Leacher, who tells them that Colt's former general in the Vietnam War, Mortars, is heading the operation. Meanwhile, Jigsaw and Mortars visit Mike McCraken, whom Jigsaw murders for losing the microfilm.

After finding the body, Colt and Luger go to Rick Becker, who claims that he laundered money with York (the money actually being in the laundry machine), but Rick is shot multiple times by unknown assailants, forcing Colt and Luger to go to the Wilderness Girls factory. The head, Destiny Demeanor, claims no knowledge of the operation during the trial, but she is revealed to be working for Mortars and his gang. Colt meets Luger's family, but he runs away when they try to seduce him. Destiny and Colt hang out at Colt's house, while Mortars sends a helicopter to destroy Colt's house (a trailer that is actually a mansion inside), but they accidentally destroy John McClane's house.

Due to lack of evidence, Doyle dismisses the case, but Colt still decides to stop the operation, much to the dismay of Luger. Luger is a by-the-book cop, after he took an unscheduled break from his crossing guard duties (as a child), which led to an old lady being run over by a car and killed. Colt breaks in and Destiny, now having fallen in love with Colt, attempts to stop Mortars, but Mortars shows that he was the one who kidnapped Claire, and shows him Rick and Claire chained to a wall (Rick actually having survived the incident). Mortars shoots Destiny, who clings to life long enough to confess her feelings for him. Colt manages to catch up with Mortars, but then Luger shows up, having considered what Colt said to him earlier. He shoots and kills Mortars, and Colt kills Jigsaw, but starts a fire that destroys the whole factory. Doyle shows up, and asks Luger to stay in the force. Luger agrees, but as long as Colt is his partner. In the end, Destiny, having survived, shows up with Rick and Claire, and the team dances to "Bohemian Rhapsody".

Cast

Cameos

Release

Box office
Loaded Weapon 1 opened at number 1 at the US box office and grossed almost $28 million in the United States and Canada in total. Internationally, it grossed $23.2 million for a worldwide total of $51.2 million. The movie, along with Excessive Force and Three of Hearts, was cited for its contribution to New Line's record pre sales in 1992 totaling $91.2 million.

Critical reception
The film received mainly negative reviews. Owen Gleiberman of Entertainment Weekly gave the film a C, comparing it negatively to the Zucker, Abrahams and Zucker films, while also noting that "the Lethal Weapon films, with their hyperbolic explosiveness, lurid repartee, and quasi-loco Mel Gibson hero, are already winking at the audience. (Last year's spoofy, ragtag Lethal Weapon 3 practically turned its own slovenliness into a running gag.) The only way to make light of them is to exaggerate the cartoon funkiness that's already at the center of their appeal. It's no wonder this Weapon ends up shooting blanks." Lawrence 
Cohn of Variety opened his review by saying that the film is "more an imitation than a parody [and is a] would-be comedy [that] is very short on laughs" Roger Ebert of The Chicago Sun-Times said the film's main failure was that the Lethal Weapon movies already contained sly spoofs of the police film genre: "The send-up doesn't feel much different than the real thing".

Clifford Terry had a more mixed review of the film; in the Chicago Tribune he remarked that "the salt-and-pepper protagonists are no-nonsense, rapid-firing cops down to their very names: Colt and Luger. Obviously, National Lampoon's Loaded Weapon I is designed as a sendup of the Lethal Weapon movies, but the benchmarks are really Police Academy and The Naked Gun. Once again, criminal activity is the game but sophomoric silliness and tastelessness call the shots."

Loaded Weapon 1 has an 18% score on the film-critic aggregator Rotten Tomatoes, based on 35 reviews with the consensus: "Loaded Weapon 1 hits all the routine targets with soft squibs, yielding a tired parody that cycles through its laundry list of references with little comedic verve".

References

External links
 
 
 

1993 films
1993 action comedy films
1990s crime comedy films
1990s parody films
American action comedy films
American buddy cop films
American police detective films
American crime comedy films
American parody films
American buddy comedy films
1990s English-language films
Films set in Los Angeles
Films shot in Los Angeles
Murder in films
National Lampoon films
New Line Cinema films
1990s police comedy films
1990s buddy cop films
3 Arts Entertainment films
Films scored by Robert Folk
Films with screenplays by Gene Quintano
Films directed by Gene Quintano
Films produced by Suzanne Todd
1990s American films